The 1983 Sovran Bank Classic was a men's tennis tournament and was played on outdoor clay courts. The event was part of the 1983 Grand Prix circuit. It was the 15th edition of the tournament and was held at Rock Creek Park in Washington, D.C. from July 18 through July 24, 1983. First-seeded José Luis Clerc won the singles title, his second at the event after 1981.

Finals

Singles
 José Luis Clerc defeated  Jimmy Arias 6–3, 3–6, 6–0
 It was Clerc's 3rd singles title of the year and the 24th of his career.

Doubles
 Mark Dickson /  Cássio Motta defeated  Paul McNamee /  Ferdi Taygan 6–2, 1–6, 6–4

References

External links
 ATP tournament profile
 ITF tournament edition details

Washington Open (tennis)
Washington Star International
Washington Star International
Washington Star International